The 2019 Blancpain GT World Challenge America was the 30th season of the United States Auto Club's Blancpain GT World Challenge America. It was the first under Blancpain sponsorship, taking over from the longtime Pirelli sponsorship, as part of the standardisation of names of Stéphane Ratel Organisation-run GT3 sprint racing series globally, following the series' acquisition by the SRO Motorsports Group. It was also the last under Blancpain sponsorship, after they and the SRO concluded their partnership at the end of 2019.  The season began on 2 March in Austin and ended on 20 October at Las Vegas.

Calendar
At the annual press conference during the 2018 24 Hours of Spa on 27 July, the Stéphane Ratel Organisation announced the first draft of the 2019 calendar. The date for the season opening weekend in Austin was confirmed on 15 August. The Grand Finale at Las Vegas was announced on 26 July.
Race format
In previous years under the Pirelli World Challenge name, a race weekend consisted of one Qualifying session, one race on Saturday (in some cases on Friday) - of which the fastest laps set up the grid for the second race - and one race on Sunday. On 7 December 2018, changes to the format of race weekends were announced. In 2019 a race weekend consisted of two races scoring equal points and featuring separate Qualifying sessions for each race. In addition to a revised schedule as the Sprint-format was dropped and the SprintX-format - 90-minute races with two drivers per car and mandatory Pit stops with driver changes - remained, the FIA international points system was adopted.

Entry list

Race results
Bold indicates overall winner.

Championship standings
Scoring system
Championship points were awarded for the first ten positions in each race. Entries were required to complete 75% of the winning car's race distance in order to be classified and earn points. Individual drivers were required to participate for a minimum of 40 minutes in order to earn championship points in any race.

Drivers' championships

Overall

Pro-Am Cup

Am Cup

Teams' championships

Overall

Pro-Am Cup

Am Cup

See also
2019 Blancpain GT Series
2019 Blancpain GT Series Endurance Cup
2019 Blancpain GT World Challenge Asia
2019 Blancpain GT World Challenge Europe

Notes

References

External links

Blancpain GT World Challenge America